Multiclavula vernalis or the orange club-mushroom lichen is a species of clavarioid fungus in the Clavulinaceae (club-mushroom lichen) family. It was originally named as a species of Clavaria in 1822 by Lewis David de Schweinitz. Ronald H. Petersen transferred it to Multiclavula in 1967.

References

External links

Clavulinaceae
Fungi described in 1822
Fungi of Europe
Fungi of North America
Taxa named by Ron Petersen
Taxa named by Lewis David de Schweinitz
Basidiolichens